Benham Hill is a hill and small settlement in the Shaw portion of the civil parish of Shaw-cum-Donnington in the English  county of Berkshire, between Thatcham and Newbury.

The settlement lies on the A4 road, and is previously the site of the Turnpike School, now West Berkshire Community Hospital.

References

Hamlets in Berkshire
West Berkshire District